Carlos Augusto Borret dos Santos (born 6 June 1990), simply known as Carlão is a Brazilian professional footballer playing for Al-Wehdat as a  defender.

Club career
Carlão started his career with Atlético-PR in Serie A making four appearances in 2009. However to get more first team appearances, he was loaned out to Figueirense and ASA in the following years. In 2011, he played for Ipatinga.

Then Carlão kicked off fis career in Greece, playing for Aiginiakos in Football League. However the club was relegated and so he returned to his country, joining Ypiranga PE in 2013. After playing for Central, he returned to Greece with Aiginiakos. Making 9 appearances for the Greek club, he again came back to his country, joining hands with América PE in 2014.

External links
 

1990 births
Living people
Footballers from Rio de Janeiro (city)
Brazilian footballers
Club Athletico Paranaense players
Figueirense FC players
Agremiação Sportiva Arapiraquense players
Central Sport Club players
América Futebol Clube (PE) players
Campeonato Brasileiro Série A players
Association football defenders